2015 Kazakhstan Super Cup was a Kazakhstan football match that was played on 1 March 2015 between the champions of 2014 Kazakhstan Premier League, Astana, and the winner of the 2014 Kazakhstan Cup, Kairat.

This match was played on 1 March at the Astana Arena. Main and extra time of the match ended with goalless draw, and Astana won the 2015 Kazakhstan Super Cup by a penalty shootout (3:2).

Match details

See also
2014 Kazakhstan Premier League
2014 Kazakhstan Cup

References

FC Astana matches
FC Kairat matches
2015
Supercup
Association football penalty shoot-outs